All They Had to Do Was Dream is an album by The Everly Brothers, released in 1985. It contains alternate takes of some of their recordings.

Track listing
 "Leave My Woman Alone" (Ray Charles)– 2:37
 "Hey, Doll Baby" – 2:18
 "I Wonder If I Care As Much" – 2:24
 "Wake Up Little Susie" (Felice Bryant, Boudleaux Bryant) – 2:45
 "Maybe Tomorrow" – 2:08
 "All I Have to Do Is Dream" (Boudleaux Bryant) – 2:38
 "Like Strangers" – 2:08
 "Poor Jenny" – 2:58
 "Oh True Love" – 2:47
 "(Till) I Kissed You" – 2:52
 "Love Of My Life" – 2:50
 "Love Of My Life (2nd Version)" – 2:24
 "When Will I Be Loved" – 2:36
 "Should We Tell Him" – 1:44
 "Kentucky" – 2:56
 "Problems" – 2:35
 "Let It Be Me" – 2:38

Personnel
Don Everly  – Guitar, Vocals
Phil Everly  – Guitar, Vocals

Production
Don Brown  – Art Direction
Sid Griffin  – Liner Notes
Bill Inglot  – Liner Notes, Compilation, Remixing
Monster X  – Design

References

The Everly Brothers compilation albums
Rhino Records compilation albums
1985 compilation albums